Michael Schär (born 29 September 1986) is a Swiss professional road bicycle racer, who currently rides for UCI WorldTeam .

Born in Geuensee, Schär has competed in thirteen Grand Tours during his career, and was the winner of the Swiss National Road Race Championships in 2013. He competed at the 2012 Summer Olympics. His father Roland Schär was also an Olympic cyclist.

Major results

2003
 3rd Road race, National Junior Road Championships
2004
 1st  Time trial, National Junior Road Championships
 4th Time trial, UCI Junior Road World Championships
2005
 1st  Time trial, National Under-23 Road Championships
 9th Giro del Lago Maggiore
2006
 1st  Time trial, National Under-23 Road Championships
 4th Paris–Roubaix Espoirs
 5th Road race, UEC European Under-23 Road Championships
 7th Overall Mainfranken-Tour
 10th Ronde Van Vlaanderen Beloften
2007
 3rd Overall Sachsen Tour
1st  Young rider classification
2012
 9th Kampioenschap van Vlaanderen
2013
 1st  Road race, National Road Championships
 7th Overall Tour of Qatar
1st Stage 2 (TTT)
 7th Overall Tour of Utah
2014
 1st Stage 2 Tour of Utah
2015
 1st Stage 9 (TTT) Tour de France
 1st Stage 3 (TTT) Critérium du Dauphiné
2016
 2nd Overall Tour des Fjords
 10th Overall Tour of Qatar
2017
 1st Stage 1 (TTT) Volta a la Comunitat Valenciana
2018
 Tour de France
1st Stage 3 (TTT)
 Combativity award Stage 13
 1st Stage 1 (TTT) Tirreno–Adriatico
 1st Stage 1 (TTT) Tour de Suisse
 1st Stage 3 (TTT) Volta a la Comunitat Valenciana
 3rd Road race, National Road Championships
 9th Great War Remembrance Race
2019
  Combativity award Stage 4 Tour de France
2020
  Combativity award Stage 1 Tour de France
2021
  Combativity award Stage 3 Tour de France

Grand Tour general classification results timeline

References

External links

 
 
 
 
 
 
 
 

1986 births
Living people
People from Sursee District
Swiss male cyclists
Cyclists at the 2012 Summer Olympics
Olympic cyclists of Switzerland
Cyclists at the 2020 Summer Olympics
Sportspeople from the canton of Lucerne